Armenia is Vasilis Papakonstantinou's second album. It was somewhat a departure from his debut and a return to the more politically oriented song cycles recorded with Mikis Theodorakis and Thomas Bakalakos. Instead of interpreting the songs of a known composer, however, in this album Papakonstantinou chose to record a series of traditional songs from Armenia with a political-revolutionary content. The lyrics were freely translated and adapted to Greek by the well-known lyricist Lefteris Papadopoulos and the music was arranged and conducted by Tzik Nakasian.

Track listing

References

1979 albums
Vasilis Papakonstantinou albums